is a former Japanese football player.

Playing career
Ishihara was born in Yamanashi Prefecture on December 9, 1971. After graduating from Nippon Sport Science University, he joined the Japan Football League club Kofu SC (later Ventforet Kofu), based in his local area, in 1994. He became a regular player as a center back during the first season and the club was promoted to the new J2 League in 1999. Although he played often, the club finished in last place for three years in a row (1999-2001). His did not play as much in 2001 and he retired at the end of the 2001 season.

Club statistics

References

External links

1971 births
Living people
Nippon Sport Science University alumni
Association football people from Yamanashi Prefecture
Japanese footballers
J2 League players
Japan Football League (1992–1998) players
Ventforet Kofu players
Association football defenders